Viano is a town and comune in the province of Reggio Emilia, in the Emilia-Romagna region of central Italy.

References

Cities and towns in Emilia-Romagna